Samo Zaen (real name Osama Alabras - born on 10 November 1979 in Kuwait) is a Syrian singer and actor, he began his career in 1999 after releasing his first album Mili Ya Helawa.

Life 
Samo Zaen was born in Kuwait to a Syrian family from Latakia, after finishing his high school he emigrated to London for studying Audio engineering. He released his first album Mili Ya Helawa in 1999, his second album Ana leek was released in 2002.

Samo Zaen changed his name from Osama to Samo for similarity to Osama bin Laden. Samo Zaen was married to an English woman named Christina and he has one daughter with her named Nagham. He held British citizenship from his marriage, they divorced and he then married the Egyptian Radio presenter Dina Saleh in 2016. He has one son with her.

Albums 
  in 2002
  in 2004
  in 2005
  in 2007
  in 2008
  in 2010
  in 2012
  in 2014
  in 2017
  in 2018

Filmography 
 Hamada in 2005
 90 minutes in 2006
 Favor of life in 2017
 Badal elhatota talata in 2018

References

External links 
 Samo Zaen in IMDb.
 Samo Zaen in Instagram

1979 births
Living people
21st-century Syrian male singers
Syrian male actors
Syrian emigrants to the United Kingdom
Syrian Muslims
Singers who perform in Egyptian Arabic